David Nyheim (born 1970) is a Norwegian peace-maker and early warning expert.  His work over the last 20 years has focused on dialogue process design and implementation, conflict resolution, conflict early warning, stabilisation, as well as forecasting and strategy.

Career history
After several years in the humanitarian and public health fields, he was recruited in 1997 to establish the Forum on Early Warning and Early Response (FEWER). His tenure as Director involved the establishment of early warning systems in the North Caucasus, West Africa, and Great Lakes region.  Concerned with the absence of responses to warnings, he worked with FEWER members to combine warning systems with multi-stakeholder dialogue and planning processes in Chechnya, DR Congo, Guinea-Conakry, and Georgia.

After leaving FEWER in 2003, Nyheim established International Conflict and Security (INCAS) Consulting Ltd. (United Kingdom) together with Anton Ivanov, Samuel Gbaydee Doe, and Tom Porteous.  He served as its Chief Executive till 2014, after which he became the Chairman of the INCAS Consulting Ltd. and its affiliated consulting companies. As a consultant, David Nyheim designed and implemented dialogue processes in Indonesia (Christian-Muslim conflicts), Mauritania (government-opposition dialogue on development), Fiji (pre-election stabilisation), and Kyrgyzstan (micro-conflicts and tensions). He worked on several stabilisation initiatives, largely for governments and companies operating in areas affected by criminalised violence. Lessons learnt from his work on preventing petroleum-related violent conflicts were published in "Balancing Petroleum Policy: Toward Value, Sustainability, and Security" by the World Bank in 2019.

Most of Nyheim's forecasting and strategy work has been for governments and multinational corporations.  In 2003, he co-authored the Peace and Security Strategy (PASS) for Shell Nigeria that accurately predicted serious instability in the Niger Delta.  After several years of focused work on the Niger Delta, which included support to later President, Dr. Goodluck Jonathan, Nyheim returned to the North Caucasus in 2005, where worked with Anton Ivanov and others on a Strategic Reconstruction and Development Assessment for the Foreign and Commonwealth Office (United Kingdom).  That same year, he developed an integrated aid-reconciliation multi-donor strategy for Myanmar that controversially argued for active engagement with the Myanmar government.

Nyheim is considered a leading thinker and practitioner of modern conflict early warning and response. His studies, "Preventing Violence, War, and State Collapse. The Future of Conflict Early Warning and Response" for the Organisation for Economic Co-operation and Development and "Early warning and response to violent conflict: Time for a rethink?" for Saferworld are widely cited.

Education
David Nyheim received his BA in political science from McGill University (Canada) in 1992. From 1992 to 1994, he studied medicine at the Catholic University of Louvain (Belgium), before joining the European Community Humanitarian Aid Office (ECHO) in 1994.  He received his MSc. in economics from the London School of Economics/London School of Hygiene and Tropical Medicine (United Kingdom) in 1996.  During this time he served as the chairperson of the Student's Union of the London School of Hygiene and Tropical Medicine.

Publications
 Nyheim, D (2019) "Petroleum Development and Conflict Prevention Strategies" in Balancing Petroleum Policy: Toward Value, Sustainability, and Security. World Bank. Washington, DC. 
 Nyheim, D (2015) Early warning and response to violent conflict: Time for a rethink? Saferworld. London.
 Nyheim, D and Ivanov, A. (2014) Stabilising Areas Affected by Criminalised Violent Conflict: A Guide for Analysis and Strategy.  INCAS in Practice Series, 01/14. Urban Guru Publishers. London.
 Nyheim, D and Chalabi, M. (2012) Corporate Implementation of the Guiding Principles: A Guide on How to Review Performance and Implement the Guiding Principles on Business and Human Rights. INCAS in Practice Series, 01/12. London, October 2012.
 Nyheim, D. (2009) Preventing Violence, War, and State Collapse. The Future of Conflict Early Warning and Response. Organisation for Economic Cooperation and Development (OECD)/DAC. Paris. 
 PDF 
 Ivanov, A., Mukomolov, A., Nyheim, D., Porteous, T., and Tartarinova, K. (alphabetical order) (2006) Strategic Reconstruction and Development Assessment: North Caucasus. Study commissioned by the Global Conflict Prevention Pool, United Kingdom.  Published by FEWER Eurasia, Moscow.
 Piza-Lopez, E., Nyheim, D., and Trijono, L. (2005) Peace and Development Analysis: A Resource Pack.  United Nations Development Programme (UNDP)/Indonesia, Jakarta.

See also
 Peace makers
 Peacemaking

References

Living people
1970 births
Norwegian male writers
Norwegian activists